Black Mozart is the fourth studio album by R&B singer-songwriter and producer Ryan Leslie, it was released on August 31, 2013. The album was released for free for whoever joined the Renegades - Leslie's own portal for fans.

Promotion
On July 29, 2013, Leslie released a 25-minute documentary titled - Ryan Leslie presents BLACK MOZART, which showed him in Europe recording the album. Then, on November 13, 2013, Leslie released a second 12-minute documentary titled - Ryan Leslie presents Black Mozart (Epilogue), which shows him recording the second half of the album.

Commercial performance
As of August 7, 2015, the album has sold 15,000 copies. The number of albums sold mirrors the number of Renegades a part of Leslie's portal.

Track listing

References

2013 albums
Ryan Leslie albums
Albums produced by Ryan Leslie
Albums produced by WondaGurl
Albums produced by Illmind
Albums produced by Cardiak